This article deals with the history of classical mechanics.

Precursors to classical mechanics

Antiquity 

The ancient Greek philosophers, Aristotle in particular, were among the first to propose that abstract principles govern nature. Aristotle argued, in On the Heavens, that terrestrial bodies rise or fall to their "natural place" and stated as a law the correct approximation that an object's speed of fall is proportional to its weight and inversely proportional to the density of the fluid it is falling through. Aristotle believed in logic and observation but it would be more than eighteen hundred years before Francis Bacon would first develop the scientific method of experimentation, which he called a vexation of nature.

Aristotle saw a distinction between "natural motion" and "forced motion", and he believed that 'in a void' i.e.vacuum, a body at rest will remain at rest  and a body in motion will continue to have the same motion. In this way, Aristotle was the first to approach something similar to the law of inertia. However, he believed a vacuum would be impossible because the surrounding air would rush in to fill it immediately. He also believed that an object would stop moving in an unnatural direction once the applied forces were removed. Later Aristotelians developed an elaborate explanation for why an arrow continues to fly through the air after it has left the bow, proposing that an arrow creates a vacuum in its wake, into which air rushes, pushing it from behind. Aristotle's beliefs were influenced by Plato's teachings on the perfection of the circular uniform motions of the heavens. As a result, he conceived of a natural order in which the motions of the heavens were necessarily perfect, in contrast to the terrestrial world of changing elements, where individuals come to be and pass away.

There is another tradition that goes back to the ancient Greeks where mathematics is used to analyze bodies at rest or in motion, which may found as early as the work of some Pythagoreans. Other examples of this tradition include Euclid (On the Balance), Archimedes (On the Equilibrium of Planes, On Floating Bodies), and Hero (Mechanica). Later, Islamic and Byzantine scholars built on these works, and these ultimately were reintroduced or became available to the West in the 12th century and again during the Renaissance.

Medieval thought
Persian Islamic polymath Ibn Sīnā published his theory of motion in The Book of Healing (1020). He said that an impetus is imparted to a projectile by the thrower, and viewed it as persistent, requiring external forces such as air resistance to dissipate it. Ibn Sina made distinction between 'force' and 'inclination' (called "mayl"), and argued that an object gained mayl when the object is in opposition to its natural motion. So he concluded that continuation of motion is attributed to the inclination that is transferred to the object, and that object will be in motion until the mayl is spent. He also claimed that projectile in a vacuum would not stop unless it is acted upon. This conception of motion is consistent with Newton's first law of motion, inertia. Which states that an object in motion will stay in motion unless it is acted on by an external force. This idea which dissented from the Aristotelian view was later described as "impetus" by John Buridan, who was influenced by Ibn Sina's Book of Healing.

In the 12th century, Hibat Allah Abu'l-Barakat al-Baghdaadi adopted and modified Avicenna's theory on projectile motion. In his Kitab al-Mu'tabar, Abu'l-Barakat stated that the mover imparts a violent inclination (mayl qasri) on the moved and that this diminishes as the moving object distances itself from the mover. According to Shlomo Pines, al-Baghdaadi's theory of motion was "the oldest negation of Aristotle's fundamental dynamic law [namely, that a constant force produces a uniform motion], [and is thus an] anticipation in a vague fashion of the fundamental law of classical mechanics [namely, that a force applied continuously produces acceleration]." 

In the 14th century, French priest Jean Buridan developed the theory of impetus, with possible influence by Ibn Sina. Albert, Bishop of Halberstadt, developed the theory further.

Formation of classical mechanics

Galileo Galilei's development of the telescope and his observations further challenged the idea that the heavens were made from a perfect, unchanging substance. Adopting Copernicus's heliocentric hypothesis, Galileo believed the Earth was the same as other planets. Though the reality of the famous Tower of Pisa experiment is disputed, he did carry out quantitative experiments by rolling balls on an inclined plane; his correct theory of accelerated motion was apparently derived from the results of the experiments. Galileo also found that a body dropped vertically hits the ground at the same time as a body projected horizontally, so an Earth rotating uniformly will still have objects falling to the ground under gravity. More significantly, it asserted that uniform motion is indistinguishable from rest, and so forms the basis of the theory of relativity. Except with respect to the acceptance of Copernican astronomy, Galileo’s direct influence on science in the 17th century outside Italy was probably not very great. Although his influence on educated laymen both in Italy and abroad was considerable, among university professors, except for a few who were his own pupils, it was negligible.

Between the time of Galileo and Newton, Christiaan Huygens was the foremost mathematician and physicist in Western Europe. He formulated the conservation law for elastic collisions, produced the first theorems of centripetal force, and developed the dynamical theory of oscillating systems. He also made improvements to the telescope, discovered Saturn's moon Titan, and invented the pendulum clock. His wave theory of light, published in Traite de la Lumiere, was later adopted by Fresnel in the form of the Huygens-Fresnel principle.

Sir Isaac Newton was the first to unify the three laws of motion (the law of inertia, his second law mentioned above, and the law of action and reaction), and to prove that these laws govern both earthly and celestial objects. Newton and most of his contemporaries hoped that classical mechanics would be able to explain all entities, including (in the form of geometric optics) light. Newton's own explanation of Newton's rings avoided wave principles and supposed that the light particles were altered or excited by the glass and resonated.

Newton also developed the calculus which is necessary to perform the mathematical calculations involved in classical mechanics. However it was Gottfried Leibniz who, independently of Newton, developed a calculus with the notation of the derivative and integral which are used to this day. Classical mechanics retains Newton's dot notation for time derivatives.

Leonhard Euler extended Newton's laws of motion from particles to rigid bodies with two additional laws. Working with solid materials under forces leads to deformations that can be quantified. The idea was articulated by Euler (1727), and in 1782 Giordano Riccati began to determine elasticity of some materials, followed by Thomas Young. Simeon Poisson expanded study to the third dimension with the Poisson ratio. Gabriel Lamé drew on the study for assuring stability of structures and introduced the Lamé parameters. These coefficients established linear elasticity theory and started the field of continuum mechanics.

After Newton, re-formulations progressively allowed solutions to a far greater number of problems. The first was constructed in 1788 by Joseph Louis Lagrange, an Italian-French mathematician. In Lagrangian mechanics the solution uses the path of least action and follows the calculus of variations. William Rowan Hamilton re-formulated Lagrangian mechanics in 1833. The advantage of Hamiltonian mechanics was that its framework allowed a more in-depth look at the underlying principles. Most of the framework of Hamiltonian mechanics can be seen in quantum mechanics however the exact meanings of the terms differ due to quantum effects.

Although classical mechanics is largely compatible with other "classical physics" theories such as classical electrodynamics and thermodynamics, some difficulties were discovered in the late 19th century that could only be resolved by more modern physics. When combined with classical thermodynamics, classical mechanics leads to the Gibbs paradox in which entropy is not a well-defined quantity. As experiments reached the atomic level, classical mechanics failed to explain, even approximately, such basic things as the energy levels and sizes of atoms.  The effort at resolving these problems led to the development of quantum mechanics. Similarly, the different behaviour of classical electromagnetism and classical mechanics under velocity transformations led to the theory of relativity.

Classical mechanics in the contemporary era 
By the end of the 20th century, classical mechanics in physics was no longer an independent theory. Along with classical electromagnetism, it has become imbedded in relativistic quantum mechanics or quantum field theory. It defines the non-relativistic, non-quantum mechanical limit for massive particles.

Classical mechanics has also been a source of inspiration for mathematicians. The realization that the phase space in classical mechanics admits a natural description as a symplectic manifold (indeed a cotangent bundle in most cases of physical interest), and symplectic topology, which can be thought of as the study of global issues of Hamiltonian mechanics, has been a fertile area of mathematics research since the 1980s.

See also
 Mechanics
 Timeline of classical mechanics

Notes

References

Classical mechanics
Classical mechanics
Isaac Newton